Novoderevenkovsky District is an administrative and municipal district (raion), one of the twenty-four in Oryol Oblast, Russia. It is located in the northeast of the oblast. Its administrative center is the urban locality (an urban-type settlement) of Khomutovo. Population: 10,704 (2010 Census);  The population of Khomutovo accounts for 39.5% of the district's total population.

Notable residents 

Grigoriy Myasoyedov (1834–1911), Realist painter, born in Pankovo

See also
Domny

References

Notes

Sources

Districts of Oryol Oblast